Pochampalle, Pochampalli or Pochampally may refer to :

 Pochampalli, Tamil Nadu, a town in Krishnagiri district, Tamil Nadu, India
 Pochampalli taluk
 Bhoodan Pochampally, a mandal in Nalgonda district, Telangana, India
 Pochampally sari, made in Boodhan Pochampally
 Gundlapochampalli, or Gundla Pochampalli, a village in Rangareddy district, Telangana, India